Molly Fletcher (born September 20, 1971) is an entrepreneur, motivational speaker and former sports agent. She is the founder of the Molly Fletcher Company, based in Atlanta, Georgia.

Early life and education

Molly Fletcher was born on September 20, 1971, in East Lansing, Michigan. She graduated from Michigan State University in 1993 with a B.A. in communications. She competed on the varsity tennis team from 1989 to 1993, captaining the team as a senior.

Fletcher moved to Atlanta shortly after graduation. She negotiated her first contract by arranging to teach tennis lessons at a luxury Atlanta apartment complex in exchange for free rent. Following a stint with Intellimedia Sports, Inc., a division of ESPN, Fletcher worked on the Super Bowl XXVIII Host Committee and then CSE.

Career

Described as the "female Jerry Maguire" by CNN and ESPN, Fletcher has recruited and represented athletes, coaches and broadcasters, including Tom Izzo, Ernie Johnson Jr., Matt Kuchar, Doc Rivers, John Smoltz, Erin Andrews, Billy Donovan, and Joe Theismann.

Works
Fletcher is the author of the following books:

Personal life
Fletcher is married with three daughters, including twins. She resides in Atlanta, Georgia with her family.

References

External links
 

American motivational speakers
Women motivational speakers
American business writers
Women business writers
American sports agents
Living people
People from East Lansing, Michigan
1971 births
Business speakers